Sarvandan (also Romanized as Sarvandān) is a village in Rostam-e Do Rural District, in the Central District of Rostam County, Fars Province, Iran. At the 2006 census, its population was 112, in 17 families.

References 

Populated places in Rostam County